A vejigante is a folkloric character in Puerto Rican festival celebrations, mainly seen during Carnival time. Traditional colors of the Vejigantes were green, yellow, and red or red and black. Today, Vejigantes wear brightly colored, ornate masks corresponding to the colors of their costumes that detail bat-like wings.  The term vejigante derives from the words vejiga (bladder) and gigante (giant) due to custom of blowing up and painting cow bladders. The masks are often linked to festivals that continue today, especially in Loíza and Ponce.

Origin 

In the 12th century, St. James the Apostle, the patron saint of Spain, was believed to have led the Catholic militia in battle against the Moors.  On his saints day, when people celebrated the victory, the vejigante represented the defeated Moors.

By the 17th century, it was typical to see processionals in Spain in which vejigantes were demons meant to terrify people into going back to church. There is a reference to vejigantes in Cervantes' Don Quixote written in 1615. when they symbolized the Devil in the battle between good and evil.

In Puerto Rico, this processional took on a new look because of the African and Taíno influence. Taínos, creators of pottery and deities called cemis, proved to be excellent mask makers. Vejigante masks are usually meant to look scary.

Festivals of St. James 
St. James saint day is celebrated in Puerto Rico with the use of the vejigantes. In today's festivals, some believe that the vejigante is a figure of resistance to colonialism and imperialism. The festivals have four main characters: el Caballero (the knight), los vejigantes, los viejos (the elders), and las locas (the crazy women). The festivals in Loiza and Ponce have their own characteristics.

In specific towns

Loíza
In Loíza, the vejigante masks are made from coconut, whose cortex has been carved out to allow a human face. The eyes and mouth are carved out of the coconut with an addition of bamboo teeth. The costume is made of "a jumper" that has a lot of extra fabric at the arms to simulate wings.

Ponce
In Ponce, the vejigante masks are made from papier-mâché and usually contain many horns. There is a yearly celebration in Barrio Playa, Ponce, that lasts three days called Carnaval de Vejigantes. The jump suit is very similar to the jumpers used in Loiza.

In popular culture
Marvel Comics released a one-shot comic book called Fantastic Four in... Ataque del M.O.D.O.K. which debuted a Puerto Rican superhero called El Vejigante, based on the urban legend.

Gallery

See also
 Carnaval de Ponce

References

External links 
Puerto Rico Music- Vejigantes
The Loiza Aldea yearly patron saint's day
Arts and Crafts

Puerto Rican culture